Dennis A. Crall (born ) is a retired United States Marine Corps lieutenant general who last served as the director for command, control, communications, and computers/cyber and chief information officer of the Joint Staff. He previously was the senior military advisor for cyber policy to the Under Secretary of Defense for Policy.

References

Living people
Place of birth missing (living people)
Recipients of the Defense Distinguished Service Medal
Recipients of the Defense Superior Service Medal
Recipients of the Legion of Merit
United States Marine Corps generals
United States Marine Corps personnel of the Iraq War
Year of birth missing (living people)